Hadibu, also known as Hadiboh, formerly known as Tamrida, is a coastal town in northern Socotra, Yemen. It is not far from the mount Jabal al-Jahir. It is the largest town of the small archipelago, with a population of 8,545 at the 2004 census. Hadibu is the capital of the Socotra Governorate and the larger eastern district of Socotra's two administrative districts, Hidaybū. For the inhabitants of the town, animal husbandry is the main source of income.

Diesel generators make electricity widely available in Socotra. A paved road runs along the north shore from Qalansiyah in the west to Hadibu and then to the DiHamri area in the east; and another paved road, from the northern coast to the southern through the Dixsam Plateau. On June 20th, 2020, the Southern Transitional Council annexed the city.

The former capital Suq is located a few km to the east of Hadibu.

References

Socotra Governorate
Populated places in Socotra
Populated coastal places in Yemen